Erkent is a village in the Pervari District of Siirt Province in Turkey. The village had a population of 222 in 2022. The village is populated by Kurds.

History 
The village had 120 families in 1989 which fell to 70 families in 1990 due to pressure from the Turkish state to work as village guards. The leaving families went for Adana. In September 1990, most of the male population was taken into custody and all except seven were later released. The village was evacuated and burned in 1993. It was later rebuilt.

Population 
Population history from 1965 to 2022:

References 

Villages in Pervari District
Kurdish settlements in Siirt Province